Stenus colon is a species of water skater, Genus Stenus, in the beetle family Staphylinidae. It is found in the North Americas .

References

Further reading

 

Steninae
Articles created by Qbugbot